The 2011–12 Football League Trophy, known as the Johnstone's Paint Trophy for sponsorship reasons, is the 28th season in the history of the competition. It is a knock-out tournament for English football clubs in League One and League Two, the third and fourth tiers of the English football.

In all, 48 clubs will enter the competition. It is split into two sections, Northern and Southern, with the winners of each section contesting the final at Wembley Stadium. Carlisle United is the defending champion, having beaten Brentford in the previous year's final, 1–0 but were beaten in the Northern Section First round by Accrington Stanley 3–2.

First round
The draw for the first round of the competition took place on 13 August 2011. Sixteen clubs were given a bye into the second round, and the remaining 32 clubs, including the holders, were divided into four geographical regions.

Northern section

Southern section

Byes

Northern section
Chesterfield, Macclesfield Town, Morecambe, Notts County, Oldham Athletic, Preston North End, Rochdale, Rotherham United.

Southern section
AFC Wimbledon, Aldershot Town, Charlton Athletic, Gillingham, Oxford United, Stevenage, Swindon Town, Yeovil Town.

Second round
The second round draw took place on 3 September 2011, with matches played in the week commencing 3 October 2011.

Northern section

Southern section

Area Quarter-finals
The area quarter finals draw took place on 8 October 2011, with matches played in the week commencing 8 November 2011.

Northern section

Southern section

Area Semi-finals
The area semi finals draw took place on 12 November 2011, with matches played in the week commencing 5 December 2011.

Northern section

Southern section

Area finals
The area finals, which serve as the semi-finals for the entire competition, were contested over two legs, home and away. 1st Leg ties due to be played by 18 January 2012.  A 2nd Leg tie will be played on Monday 30 January 2012 and another on 7 February 2012

Northern section

Chesterfield won 3–1 on aggregate

Southern section

Swindon Town won 2–1 on aggregate

Final

References

3. https://web.archive.org/web/20120328055822/http://www.football-league.co.uk/johnstonespainttrophy/news/20111207/trophy-area-finals-draw_2293332_2540268 07/12/2011

External links
Official website

EFL Trophy
Trophy
Trophy